Hamood Sultan Mathkoor (born 1958, in Muharraq) is a former Bahraini football goalkeeper. He spent his career at Muharraq Club and was a key member of his team's successes in the 1980s and 1990s.

Career
Sultan played with the Bahrain national football team in 9 Gulf Cups, from the 1976 tournament in Qatar to the 1994 tournament in UAE.

He won the best Asian goalkeeper award in 1994 and also the best goalkeeper in 3 different Gulf Cups.

He is working now as a football pundit for Al-Kass sports channel in Qatar.

Honours
 AFC Century Award

References

1958 births
Living people
Bahraini footballers
Association football goalkeepers
Al-Muharraq SC players
1988 AFC Asian Cup players
People from Muharraq